Ryonghŭng-sa is a Korean Buddhist temple in Ponghung-ri, Yŏnggwang-gun, South Hamgyŏng Province, North Korea. Located on the slopes of Mt. Paegun, the temple was founded in 1048 under the Koryo dynasty and later renovated in 1794 under Joseon. The complex includes the following halls:

 Taeung Hall (대웅전/)
 Hyangno Hall (향노전/)
 Muryangsu Shrine (무량수각/)
 Sansin Shrine (산신각/)
 Unha Pavilion (운하당/)

References

 http://www.kcckp.net/en/periodic/todaykorea/index.php/index.php?contents+3860+2008-11+115+30

See also
National Treasures of North Korea
Korean Buddhism
Korean architecture

Buildings and structures in South Hamgyong Province
Buddhist temples in North Korea
National Treasures of North Korea
1048 establishments in Asia